The British PGA Matchplay Championship was a match play golf tournament that began in 1903 and ran until 1979. Between 1903 and 1969, the event was sponsored by the now defunct British newspaper the News of the World, and was commonly known by the paper's name. Initially organised as the championship of British professionals, the event came to include invited players from other countries – in particular from around the Commonwealth (it was won on four occasions by Australia's Peter Thomson, a record number of victories shared with Dai Rees and James Braid). On occasion, American professionals also took part, notably in 1949 when eight members of the victorious U.S. Ryder Cup side accepted invites to the event, Lloyd Mangrum reaching the semi-finals.

For many years, the event had the richest prize fund in British golf, and certainly in the pre-First World War era, can be considered to have been a "major" championship of its day, as at the time, the British professionals were considered the best players in the world – in 1907 the four semi-finalists were the Great Triumvirate of Harry Vardon, J. H. Taylor and James Braid, along with Ted Ray, who would go on to win both the British and U.S. Opens.

After World War II, the event provided several notable British and Irish players, like Christy O'Connor Snr, Eric Brown and Dave Thomas, with their greatest triumphs, and also became a showcase for the matchplay strength of Neil Coles, who was at least a semi-finalist eleven times in eighteen years, a remarkable achievement considering the field normally comprised 64 and on occasion 128 players.

The tournament was also often notable for remarkable runs to the later stages by veteran players – Max Faulkner was a semi-finalist in 1967 aged 51 and reached the quarter-finals three years later, and in 1969 Dai Rees reached the final aged 56. However, following the establishment of the British PGA Championship (at stroke play) in 1955, the matchplay version lost some of its importance, and the matchplay format fell out of favour with sponsors, who could not guarantee that the final day would feature any "big-name" players to attract a television audience, nor either that the matches would finish at times to coincide with limited scheduled slots for live transmission. The tournament remained an official money event on the European Tour from its first season in 1972, but was discontinued following the 1979 event when a replacement sponsor could not be found after Sun Alliance moved to supporting the stroke play championship instead. The last champion was Irishman Des Smyth, who beat a youthful Nick Price in the final.

History

1903
The tournament was announced in August. £200 had been given by the News of the World to the PGA for the competition. The final stage would be at Sunningdale Golf Club from 13 to 15 October and would be a knock-out match-play contest by 32 professionals. Qualification was by a series of 36-hole stroke-play competitions; one for each of the five PGA sections. The number of qualifiers from each section was based on the membership of that section. The Southern section had 16 qualifiers, the Midland and Northern sections had 5 each, the Scottish section 4 and the Irish section 2. The matches in the final stage were over 18 holes except for the final which was over 36 holes. Extra holes were played in the event of a tied match. The winner received £100, the runner-up £30, losing semi-finalists £15 and losing quarter-finalists £10. The semi-finalists also received medals: the winner gold, the runner-up silver and the losing semi-finalists bronze.

In the first round Jack White, third in the 1903 Open Championship lost to Tom Williamson. Later in the day Tom Vardon who had been second in the Open lost to Ted Ray. In the quarter-finals James Braid beat Alfred Toogood at the 19th hole. In the semi-finals Braid won the first two holes against J.H. Taylor and won 4&2. Ray beat George Coburn 4&3 in the other match. They had been level after 7 holes but Ray won the next 4 to take a convincing lead. In the final Braid led by 1 hole after the first round. In the afternoon Braid won 3 of the first 5 holes to go 4 up and, although Ray won the next two, Braid eventually won 4&3.

1914
The final stages were planned for Oxhey Golf Club on 6, 7 and 8 October with the same format and prize money as previously. In mid-August the PGA cancelled the tournament. The Western section had played their qualification tournament on 9 July at which Charles and Ernest Whitcombe qualified.

1919
The arrangements for the 1919 tournament were sorted out at a late stage. In mid-July it was decided that the number of qualifiers for the final stage would be increased from 32 to 64 and the "News of the World" agreed to increase the prize money.  The West of England section had already played their qualifying competition under the impression there were 2 places available. They were allocated 4 in the new system. Other sections were allocated the following places: Southern 26, Northern 12, Midland 10, Scotland 5, Welsh 4, Eastern 2 and Irish 1. The tournament was extended to a fourth day with the 32 18-hole first round matches played on the first day. The losing quarter-finalists received £12 10s, third round losers £10, second round losers £7 10s and first round losers £5. Prize money totalled £590.

1921
Prize money was increased to £750 with the winner receiving £200, the runner-up £50, the losing semi-finalists £30, the losing quarter-finalists £15 and third round losers £12 10s.

1925
Prize money was increased to £1,040 with the winner receiving £300, the runner-up £100, the losing semi-finalists £50, the losing quarter-finalists £25 and prizes of £15, £10 and £5 for losers in the first three rounds.

1935
Prize money was increased to £1,250 with the losing quarter-finalists receiving £27 10s and prizes of £20, £15 and £7 10s for losers in the first three rounds.

1939
The final stages were planned for St George's Hill Golf Club from 12 to 15 September with the same format and prize money as previously. Qualifying events had been completed when the PGA cancelled the tournament in early September on the outbreak of World War II.

1940
The cancelled 1939 event was re-arranged for Royal Mid-Surrey Golf Club from 30 April to 3 May. The 64 qualifiers for the 1939 tournament were invited although a number were unable to play.

1945
The 1945 event was arranged at short notice and there were no qualifying events. There were 149 entries and the tournament was played at Walton Heath Golf Club from 23 to 27 July. 21 matches were played on the first day to reduce the field to 128. There were 64 matches on the second day and then two rounds were played each day. The final was played over 18 holes for the first time. Both New and Old courses were used for the last-128 and last-64 rounds. Total prize money was £2,000 with the winner receiving £600, the runner-up £200, semi-finalists £100, quarter-finalists £50 and prizes of £30, £15 and £10 for those reaching the last-64 stage.

1946
The 1946 tournament reverted to the earlier format with 64 players qualifying for the knock-out stage played from 25 to 28 September. The final was over 36 holes. Prize money remained at £2,000 with £550 for the winner, £250 for the losing finalist and £120 for the losing semi-finalists.

1947
Prize money was increased to £2,500 with £750 for the winner and £250 for the losing finalist.

1949
Eight American golfers who had played in the 1949 Ryder Cup were added to the 64 qualifiers. The 8 were: Skip Alexander, Jimmy Demaret, Bob Hamilton, Dutch Harrison, Clayton Heafner, Lloyd Mangrum, Johnny Palmer and Sam Snead. The additional players meant that 8 preliminary match had to be played to reduce the field to 64. These matches were played on 20 September, extending the event to a fifth day. Total prize money was £2,620.

1950
The 1949 winner (Dai Rees) and the 1950 Open Champion (Bobby Locke) were exempted from qualifying. Locke did not play but with 64 players reaching the final stage through the sectional qualifying events there were 65 qualifiers. This meant that one preliminary match was needed; the match being played the day before the main event started. Total prize money was £2,530.

1951
The 1950 winner (Dai Rees) and the 1951 Open Champion (Max Faulkner) were exempted from qualifying. With a total of 66 players reaching the final stage, two preliminary matches were played the day before the main event started.

1953
The leaders in the Order of Merit were exempted, increasing the number of qualifiers to 76. 12 first-round matches were played to reduce the field to 64. Total prize money was £2,650.

1955
The leader 10 in the Order of Merit were exempted. 10 first-round matches were played to reduce the field to 64. Total prize money was increased to £3,000, although the first prize remained unchanged at £750.

1956
The number of qualifiers from the sectional events was reduced so that there were just 64 contestants in the final stage. The quarter-finals and semi-finals were extended to 36 holes, the event being played over 5 days from 11 to 15 September.

1957
The format was changed, with the first round matches being over 36 holes, spread over two days. The quarter-finals and semi-finals were reduced again to 18 holes, although the final was still over 36 holes.

1958
The format was changed again. All matches were reduced to 18 holes and the event reduced from 5 days to 4. One round was played on the first two days, the third round and quarter-finals were played on the third day with the semi-finals and final on the final day. This was only the second final, after 1945, to be contested over 18 holes.

1962
Sectional qualifying was dropped and replaced by local qualifying on the two days prior to the knock-out stage. Two courses were used. There was a sudden-death playoff to get exactly 64 qualifiers.

1964
12 players who had competed in the Carling World Open the previous week were exempted from qualifying so that only 52 qualified through local qualifying.

Winners

See also
Volvo World Match Play Championship – another matchplay championship played in the United Kingdom, which has been an official money event on the European Tour since 2004.

References

External links
Coverage on the European Tour's official site

Golf tournaments in the United Kingdom
Former European Tour events
Recurring sporting events established in 1903
Recurring sporting events disestablished in 1979
1903 establishments in England
1979 disestablishments in England
Defunct sports competitions in the United Kingdom